The Anypotactini are a Neotropical weevil tribe in the subfamily Entiminae. It includes 81 described species.

Distribution 
The tribe ranges from south-western USA (Texas) to Argentina and Chile and some Caribbean islands. Most genera are distributed in Central America and northern South America, but the largest genus, Hyphantus Germar, 1824  (45 species ), is distributed in southern Brazil, Argentina, Paraguay and Uruguay.

The Central American species were studied by Champion (1911).

Diagnosis 
Most anypotactines are small (approx. 4–11 mm), covered by brown scales, with some members of the genus Prepodellus covered by metallic green or blue scales. The dorsal surface of the body usually bears thick and erect scale-like setae, rather uniformly distributed. Members of the genus Hyphantus tend to be larger and dark in coloration.

Genera 
 Anypotactus Schönherr, 1840: 299 
 Bothinodontes Kirsch, 1868: 241 
 Cylloproctus Faust, 1892: 22 
 Helicorrhynchus Olliff, 1891: 61 
 Hyphantus Germar, 1824: 334 
 Hypsometopus Kirsch, 1868: 222 
 Neoanypotactus Hustache, 1938: 266 
 Nototactus Kuschel, 1952: 231 
 Paonaupactus Voss, 1953: 127 (+) 
 Phanasora Pascoe, 1881: 38 
 Polydacrys Schönherr, 1834: 130 
 Prepodellus Kirsch, 1868: 239 
 Sitonites Heer, 1864: 90 (+)

References

External links 

Entiminae
Beetle tribes